Harra es-Sawad, or the "Shuqra Volcanic Field", is a large trachybasaltic volcanic field that runs along the Gulf of Aden. Nearby is the city of Shuqrah.

Morphology
This has produced a  lava field, which is mostly Holocene in age, and covers faulted basement limestone. Many of the fields cones are young and uneroded.

History
The only eruption that has been noted in historical times occurred in 1253. This eruption was a large VEI 3 eruption, although it was poorly documented. Given the age of the field, other eruptions may have occurred in the recent past.

See also
 Hadhramaut Mountains
 List of volcanoes in Yemen
 Sarat Mountains

References

External links
 Cones of the Volcanic Field 
 Volcanic Cone 

Volcanoes of Yemen
Active volcanoes
VEI-3 volcanoes